Christian Gustavo Bassedas (born 16 February 1973) is an Argentine former footballer who played as a defensive midfielder. 

Bassedas made 267 appearances for Vélez Sársfield, giving him the eleventh most appearances in club history. He is currently the head coach of UAI Urquiza.

Career

Club

Bassedas is a product of Vélez Sársfield youth divisions, club where he debuted professionally on 3 March 1991. He played as a sweeper (libero), and was an important part of Vélez most successful years during the 1990s. He won four national championships with the club, and five international (including the 1994 Intercontinental Cup, where he was a starter in the 2–0 victory over A.C. Milan).

In 2000, he joined English FA Premier League club Newcastle United for £3,500,000. He played for them in the period 2000–2003, though on loan to Tenerife briefly during the 2001–02 season. He scored once in the league for Newcastle in a 3–1 defeat at Chelsea in January 2001.

In 2003, he joined Argentine Newell's Old Boys, but after two months of pre-season training he decided to retire from football at the age of 30.

He later worked for Fox Sports en Latinoamérica as a commentator on FA Premier League matches.

International

Bassedas played for the Argentina national team during the 1998 FIFA World Cup qualification matches, but was not part of the squad for the World Cup. He also won a silver medal at the 1996 Olympics and a gold medal at the 1995 Pan Americans, where he captained the team.

Management

At the end of 2008, Bassedas was appointed as sports consultant of Vélez Sársfield of the Argentine Primera División. His first order of business was to recommend Ricardo Gareca to fill the coaching spot. He was also essential in the negotiations to bring Maximiliano Moralez, Sebastián Domínguez and Joaquín Larrivey to the club. In his first season with the club, Vélez won the Clausura 09.

In November 2015, he was appointed as manager of Vélez Sársfield. He resigned in September 2016, after a 0–3 loss against Racing Club, citing the violent reaction Vélez supporters as his reason for leaving.

He was appointed as the head coach of Club Olimpo on 20 December 2017.

On 6 October 2018, Bassedas was appointed as the head coach of UAI Urquiza.

Honours

Player

Club
Vélez Sársfield

 Primera División Argentina (4): Clausura 93, Apertura 95, Clausura 96, Clausura 98
 Copa Libertadores (1): 1994
 Intercontinental Cup (1): 1994
 Copa Interamericana (1): 1994
 Supercopa Sudamericana (1): 1996
 Recopa Sudamericana (1): 1997

International
Argentina national team

 Pan American Gold Medal (1): Mar del Plata 1995
 Olympic Silver Medal (1): Atlanta 1996

General manager
Vélez Sársfield

Primera División Argentina (1): Clausura 09

References

External links
 
  
 
 Profile at Vélez Sársfield's official website 

1973 births
Living people
Footballers from Buenos Aires
Argentine footballers
Argentine expatriate footballers
Argentina youth international footballers
Argentina international footballers
Expatriate footballers in England
Expatriate footballers in Spain
1995 King Fahd Cup players
1997 Copa América players
Association football midfielders
Olympic footballers of Argentina
Footballers at the 1996 Summer Olympics
Olympic silver medalists for Argentina
Club Atlético Vélez Sarsfield footballers
Newcastle United F.C. players
CD Tenerife players
Argentine Primera División players
Premier League players
La Liga players
Argentine expatriate sportspeople in Spain
Argentine expatriate sportspeople in England
Olympic medalists in football
Medalists at the 1996 Summer Olympics
Pan American Games gold medalists for Argentina
Club Atlético Vélez Sarsfield managers
Pan American Games medalists in football
Footballers at the 1995 Pan American Games
Argentine football managers
Medalists at the 1995 Pan American Games